Lloyd Leftwich was a state legislator in Alabama during the Reconstruction era. He was a state senator from 1872 to 1876. He was photographed with other members of the state senate in 1872.

Leftwich bought a 122-acre farm from his former owner. He and his wife had eight children. They learned to read and write. They donated land for the Lloyd Chapel Baptist Church and Lloyd Eoementary School. He lived in Forkland, Alabama. His eldest child, John Carter Leftwich became a college president, founded a college, and published a newspaper.

See also
List of African-American officeholders during Reconstruction

References

19th-century American politicians
American former slaves
African-American politicians during the Reconstruction Era
American farmers
Alabama state senators
People from Greene County, Alabama
Year of birth missing
Year of death missing